Jernej Damjan (born 28 May 1983) is a Slovenian former ski jumper.

Career 

Damjan won a bronze medal in the team normal hill event at the 2005 FIS Nordic World Ski Championships in Oberstdorf, and finished 6th in the individual normal hill event. His best individual finish at the Winter Olympics was 9th place in the normal hill event at the 2014 Winter Olympics. His best individual finish at the FIS Ski Flying World Championships was 12th place in 2008.

Tournament results

Olympic Games

World Championships
2 medals (2 bronze)

Ski Flying World Championships
2 medals (1 silver, 1 bronze)

World Cup

Standings

Individual wins

References

External links 

1983 births
Living people
Skiers from Ljubljana
Olympic ski jumpers of Slovenia
Slovenian male ski jumpers
Ski jumpers at the 2006 Winter Olympics
Ski jumpers at the 2010 Winter Olympics
Ski jumpers at the 2014 Winter Olympics
Ski jumpers at the 2018 Winter Olympics
FIS Nordic World Ski Championships medalists in ski jumping
Universiade medalists in ski jumping
Universiade gold medalists for Slovenia
Competitors at the 2003 Winter Universiade